One third of Rushmoor Borough Council in Hampshire, England is elected each year, followed by one year without election. From 1979, the council had 15 3-member wards, reduced to 14 wards in 2002 and 13 in 2012. Each ward elects 3 of the 39 councillors, one in each election year, for a term of 4 years, except in years when ward boundaries are changed when all councillors are elected for terms depending on their position in the poll.

Political control
Since the foundation of the council in 1973 political control of the council has been held by the following parties:

Leadership
The leaders of the council since 2001 have been:

Council composition 
Since the current ward boundaries came in for the 2012 election, the composition of Rushmoor Borough Council has been:

Council elections
1973 Rushmoor Borough Council election
1976 Rushmoor Borough Council election
1979 Rushmoor Borough Council election (New ward boundaries)
1980 Rushmoor Borough Council election
1982 Rushmoor Borough Council election
1983 Rushmoor Borough Council election
1984 Rushmoor Borough Council election
1986 Rushmoor Borough Council election
1987 Rushmoor Borough Council election
1988 Rushmoor Borough Council election
1990 Rushmoor Borough Council election (Borough boundary changes took place but the number of seats remained the same)
1991 Rushmoor Borough Council election
1992 Rushmoor Borough Council election (Borough boundary changes took place but the number of seats remained the same)
1994 Rushmoor Borough Council election
1995 Rushmoor Borough Council election
1996 Rushmoor Borough Council election
1998 Rushmoor Borough Council election
1999 Rushmoor Borough Council election
2000 Rushmoor Borough Council election
2002 Rushmoor Borough Council election (New ward boundaries reduced the number of seats by 3)
2003 Rushmoor Borough Council election
2004 Rushmoor Borough Council election
2006 Rushmoor Borough Council election
2007 Rushmoor Borough Council election
2008 Rushmoor Borough Council election
2010 Rushmoor Borough Council election
2011 Rushmoor Borough Council election
2012 Rushmoor Borough Council election (New ward boundaries reduced the number of seats by 3)
2014 Rushmoor Borough Council election
2015 Rushmoor Borough Council election
2016 Rushmoor Borough Council election
2018 Rushmoor Borough Council election
2019 Rushmoor Borough Council election
2021 Rushmoor Borough Council election
2022 Rushmoor Borough Council election

Borough result maps

By-election results

1993–1997

1997–2001

2005–2009

2009–2013

2013–2017

2017–2020

References

 By-election results

External links
Rushmoor Borough Council

 
Rushmoor
Council elections in Hampshire
District council elections in England